Zaki Harari (born 7 February 1926) was an Egyptian basketball player. He competed in the men's tournament at the 1952 Summer Olympics.

References

External links
 

1926 births
Possibly living people
Egyptian men's basketball players
Olympic basketball players of Egypt
Basketball players at the 1952 Summer Olympics
Sportspeople from Cairo